George Dewar may refer to:

 George Dewar (Canadian politician) (1915–2003), Canadian physician and politician in Prince Edward Island
 George Dewar (Australian politician) (1868–1953), New South Wales politician
 George E. Dewar (1895–1969), New Zealand poet, writer, teacher, farmer, worker and First World War soldier
 George F. Dewar (1865–1961), physician and political figure in Prince Edward Island, Canada
 Geordie Dewar (George Dewar, 1867–1915), Scottish footballer